Four the Hard Way is the fourth Danger Danger album, and the second featuring singer Paul Laine. It was also a return to their classic sound. Former members Andy Timmons and Kasey Smith contributed to the album.

Track listing
 "Still Kickin'" - 4:01
 "Sick Little Twisted Mind" - 5:44
 "Jaded" - 3:19
 "Captain Bring Me Down" - 5:03
 "Goin' All the Way" - 3:42
 "The Girl Ain't Built to Sleep Alone" - 4:52
 "Goin' Goin' Gone" - 4:10
 "Afraid of Love" - 5:22
 "Heartbreak Suicide" - 4:45
 "I Don't Need You" - 5:23
 "Comin' Home '98" (Bonus Track)

Personnel

Band
 Paul Laine - lead vocals (tracks 1, 3 - 10); backing vocals; keyboards (tracks 4, 9, 10); wah-wah guitar (track 3); acoustic guitar (track 4)
 Bruno Ravel - bass; guitar (tracks 4 - 6, 9, 10); backing vocals (tracks 1, 8 - 10); keyboards (track 8); lead vocals (track 2); guitar noise
 Steve West - drums, percussion

Guest musicians
Andy Timmons - guitar (tracks 1, 2, 7, 8); backing vocals (track 1)
Tony Bruno - guitar (tracks 3 - 6, 9, 10)
Kasey Smith - keyboards (tracks 5, 7)

References

1998 albums
Danger Danger albums